Run for Your Life, or variants, may refer to:

Literature 
 Run for Your Life (Line novel), a 1966 children's novel by Lionel Davidson
 Run for Your Life (Patterson novel), a 2009 novel by James Patterson and Michael Ledwidge

Film and television 
 Run for Your Life (1988 film), an Italian-British film directed by Terence Young
 Run for Your Life (Swedish: Spring för livet), a 1997 Swedish film directed by Richard Hobert
 Run for Your Life, a 2008 American documentary directed by Judd Ehrlich
 Run for Your Life (2014 film), starring Amy Smart
 Run for Your Life (TV series), a 1960s US TV series
 "Run for Your Life", an episode of Highlander: The Series
 "Run for Your Lives!", episode 15 of Ovide and the Gang
 The Big Knights: Run For Your Lives!, animation The Big Knights
 Salve-se Quem Puder, a 2020 Brazilian telenovela also known as Run for your lives

Music

Albums
 Run for Your Life (The Creepshow album) or the title song, 2008
 Run for Your Life (Yellowjackets album), 1994
 Run for Your Life, by The Producers, 1985
 Run for Your Life, by Tarney/Spencer Band, 1979
 Run for Your Lives!, by Flight Distance, 2005

Songs
 "Run for Your Life" (Beatles song), 1965
 "Run for Your Life" (Bucks Fizz song), 1983
 "Run for Your Life" (The Fray song), 2012
 "Run for Your Life" (Måns Zelmerlöw song), 2014
 "Run for Your Life" (Matt Cardle song), 2011
 "Run for Your Life", by Eric Burdon from I Used to Be an Animal, 1988
 "Run for Your Life", by Freda Payne from Payne & Pleasure, 1974
 "Run for Your Life", by Kumi Koda, a B-side of the single "Freaky", 2007
 "Run for Your Life", by Loudness from Thunder in the East, 1985
 "Run for Your Life", by Northern Line, 1999
 "Run for Your Life", by Riot from Fire Down Under, 1981
 "Run for Your Life", by Riot from Thundersteel, 1988
 "Run for Your Life", by Robert Randolph and the Family Band from Unclassified, 2003
 "Run for Your Life", by Runner, 1979
 "Run for Your Life", by Stratus, 1985
 "Run for Your Life", by Tiffany Young, 2019
 "Run for Your Life", by Twisted Sister from Under the Blade, 1982
 "Run for Your Life", composed by Jimmy Van Heusen and Sammy Cahn for the musical Skyscraper, 1965
 "Run for Your Lives", by Saxon from Crusader, 1984
 "Run for Your Lives", from the soundtrack  Children of Earth, 2009

Other uses
Run for your lives, 2015 sculpture by Gillie and Marc
Run for Your Lives (obstacle racing), an obstacle course adventure run in the United States

See also 
 Run for Your Wife (disambiguation)